This article lists the prime ministers of Equatorial Guinea, a country in the Gulf of Guinea and on the western equatorial coast of Central Africa, since the establishment of the office of prime minister of Spanish Guinea in 1963. Bonifacio Ondó Edu was the first person to hold the office, taking effect on 15 December 1963. The incumbent is Manuela Roka Botey, having taken office on 1 February 2023.

List of officeholders
Political parties

Other factions

Prime minister of Spanish Guinea (1963–1968)

Prime ministers of Equatorial Guinea (1968–present)

Timeline

See also

 Politics of Equatorial Guinea
 List of presidents of Equatorial Guinea
 Vice President of Equatorial Guinea
 List of colonial governors of Spanish Guinea

External links
 World Statesmen – Equatorial Guinea

 
Equatorial Guinea
Prime ministers
Prime ministers